Daniel Berlin (born 22 March 1987) is a Swedish bandy player who currently plays for Sandvikens AIK as a midfielder/winger.

Career

Club career
Berlin is a youth product of Sirius and has represented Sandviken, Dynamo Moscow, and Bollnäs GIF.

International career
Berlin was part of Swedish World Champions teams of 2009, 2010, 2012, and 2017.

Honours

Country
 Sweden
 Bandy World Championship: 2009, 2010, 2012, 2017

References

External links
 
 

1987 births
Living people
Swedish bandy players
IK Sirius players
Sandvikens AIK players
Dynamo Moscow players
Bollnäs GIF players
Expatriate bandy players in Russia
Sweden international bandy players
Bandy World Championship-winning players